Edward Frederick Joseph Yost (October 13, 1926 – October 16, 2012) was an American professional baseball player and coach. He played most of his Major League Baseball career as a third baseman for the Washington Senators, then played two seasons each with the Detroit Tigers and the Los Angeles Angels before retiring in 1962.

The ,  Yost batted and threw right-handed. He was nicknamed "The Walking Man" for the numerous bases on balls he drew, and continues to rank 11th all-time among major leaguers in that category, ahead of the likes of Pete Rose, Willie Mays, Stan Musial, and Hank Aaron. Yost was considered one of the best leadoff hitters and defensive third basemen of his era.

Major League career
Yost was born in Brooklyn, New York, where he played baseball and basketball at New York University (NYU) before signing with the Washington Senators as an amateur free agent in 1944. He made his Major League debut with the Senators at the age of 17 on August 16, 1944, having never played in the minor leagues. Yost spent the 1945 season in the United States Navy before returning to the Senators in 1946.

In 1950, Yost posted career highs with a .295 batting average and a .440 on-base percentage. In 1951, he led the American League with 36 doubles and produced a career-high 65 runs batted in. He earned a place as a reserve player for the American League team in the 1952 All-Star Game. Between August 30, 1949, and May 11, 1955, Yost played in 829 consecutive games for the Senators, the ninth-longest consecutive game streak in major league history. Yost's home run totals were limited by Washington's cavernous Griffith Stadium. Between 1944 and 1953, he hit only three home runs at home while hitting 52 home runs on the road.

On December 6, 1958, after 14 seasons with the Senators, Yost was traded to the Detroit Tigers, allowing the Senators to make room for young prospect Harmon Killebrew. Playing in hitter-friendly Tiger Stadium in 1959, his home run production climbed to a career-high of 21 and, he led the American League with 115 runs scored, 135 base on balls and a .435 on-base percentage. In 1960, he again led the league in base on balls and on-base percentage. Yost spent two seasons with the Tigers before being selected by the Los Angeles Angels in the 1961 American League expansion draft.

Yost was the first Angels player to appear in a major league game, leading off in the team's first game, played at Baltimore on April 11, 1961. In his last plate appearance as a major league player, he received a base on balls.

Career statistics

In an 18-year career, Yost played in 2,109 games, accumulating 1,863 hits in 7,346 at bats for a .254 career batting average along with 139 home runs, 683 runs batted in and an on-base percentage of .394. He ended his career with a .957 fielding percentage. Yost led the American League in bases on balls on six occasions and logged 1,614 over his 18-year career, ranking him 11th on the all-time walks list. In 1956, he had a .412 on-base percentage while posting a .231 batting average, the lowest batting average with a .400 on-base percentage in major league history. Yost hit 28 home runs to lead off a game, a record which stood until Bobby Bonds broke it in the 1970s.

Yost led American League third basemen eight times in putouts, seven times in double plays, three times in assists and twice in fielding percentage. He set American League career records with 2,356 putouts, 3,659 assists, and 6,285 total chances. His 2,356 putouts ranks him third all-time among third basemen behind Brooks Robinson and Jimmy Collins. In 1960, he surpassed Pie Traynor's major league record for most games played as a third baseman with 1,865 games. Yost was the first third baseman in history to appear in more than 2,000 games. Baseball historian Bill James ranked Yost 24th all-time among third baseman in his Historical Baseball Abstract.

Yost attended New York University during the off-season, from which he earned a Master's degree in physical education in 1953.

Coaching career
Yost followed his long playing career with a 23-season career as a coach. After Washington began the season by losing 26 of its first 40 games, Vernon was replaced by Gil Hodges. Yost served as interim manager during the brief transition, losing his only game as manager, 9–3 to the Chicago White Sox, on May 22, 1963. Yost then continued on Hodges' Washington staff through .

In , he continued his coaching career with the Boston Red Sox, coaching at third base for eight more seasons, through , under skippers Don Zimmer and Ralph Houk. By his retirement at the close of the 1984 campaign, Yost had spent 40 years in uniform in professional baseball, all of them at the major-league level.

Personal life and family
While playing for the Detroit Tigers, Yost married Patricia Healy, who worked for their front office in public relations. They had two daughters, Felita Yost Carr and Alexis; a son, Mike; and two grandsons, Edward and Joseph. Patricia died on January 6, 2007.

Yost's daughter Felita competed in ice dancing during the 1997 U.S. Figure Skating Championships. Following her active career in ice skating, she is now a coach of figure skating.

Eddie's son, Michael is current Boston College indoor pole vault record holder.

His grandson Edward played varsity baseball at Huntington Beach High School in California and is a lefthand pitcher. Edward was a member of the 2015 HBHS varsity baseball team which won the California Interscholastic Federation – Southern Section Division 1 Championship on June 6, 2015. Edward Yost is currently playing for Pepperdine University as part of the Pepperdine Waves baseball team.

Yost and his family had moved to Boston's western suburbs during his tenure with the Red Sox and he lived there in retirement. He died of cardiovascular disease in Weston, Massachusetts, on October 16, 2012, aged 86.

See also
 List of Major League Baseball career runs scored leaders
 List of Major League Baseball annual runs scored leaders
 List of Major League Baseball annual doubles leaders
 Major League Baseball consecutive games played streaks

References

External links

|-
! colspan="3" style="border-top: 5px solid #F5DEB3;" | Managing/coaching

1926 births
2012 deaths
American League All-Stars
Boston Red Sox coaches
Detroit Tigers players
Los Angeles Angels coaches
Los Angeles Angels players
Major League Baseball third base coaches
Major League Baseball third basemen
New York Mets coaches
NYU Violets baseball players
People from Ozone Park, Queens
People from Wellesley, Massachusetts
Sportspeople from Brooklyn
Sportspeople from Queens, New York
Baseball players from New York City
United States Navy personnel of World War II
Washington Senators (1901–1960) players
Washington Senators (1961–1971) coaches
Washington Senators (1961–1971) managers